Đorđe Lazović (born 16 November 1992) is a Serbian professional football goalkeeper who currently plays for Radnički Kragujevac.

Club career
Lazović came through the youth system of Vojvodina, being promoted to the senior squad in early 2010. He was loaned to Serbian League Vojvodina club Palić ahead of the 2010–11 season, before returning to Vojvodina in early 2011. After the end of the first part of the 2011–12 season, Lazović went on loan to Dunav Stari Banovci in early 2012.

In the summer of 2012, Lazović moved on loan to Javor Ivanjica. He spent two seasons at the club, making his Serbian SuperLiga debuts in 2013. After leaving Ivanjica in the summer of 2014, Lazović was on the rosters of Spartak Subotica and OFK Beograd, however failed to make a competitive debut.

In late 2016, early 2017, Lazović trained with Partizan. Shortly after he signed a two-year contract with club, he was optionally loaned to satellite club Teleoptik until the end of 2016–17 season, but stayed in club playing with reserves. He released by the club at the beginning on 29 January 2018, after which he moved to Radnički Niš.

International career
In 2013 and 2014, Lazović received several call-ups for the Serbia national under-21 team

References

External links
 

Association football goalkeepers
FK Javor Ivanjica players
FK Palić players
FK Partizan players
FK Radnički Niš players
FK Proleter Novi Sad players
FK Spartak Subotica players
FK Teleoptik players
FK Vojvodina players
OFK Beograd players
People from Ivanjica
Serbian footballers
Serbian SuperLiga players
Serbian First League players
1992 births
Living people